A Bug and a Bag of Weed is a 2006 comedy film directed by David Gonella and starring Sebastian Spence, Chris Cuthbertson, and Drew Hagen.

Plot
Peter Jordan is 31 years old, $35,000 in debt, and he's been working at Super Duper Computers for seven long years. Together with his equally down-on-their-luck co-workers Stan and Willie, Peter dreams of escaping the daily drudgery of "don't forget to sell the extended warranty", and "if you have time to lean, you have time to clean". Peter's existence in Big Box Retail Commission hell is further fueled by rival Salesman Rommel who steals Peter's customers and computer sales behind his back. Just when things seem to be at their worst, Peter's long lost high school buddy Frehley blows into town and turns Peter, Stan and Willie's humdrum lives into a non-stop beer-soaked party, full of loud music, strip clubs, and beautiful girls! And with Frehley yelling "You only live once!", Peter whips out the credit cards to buy his dream car, a classic Volkswagen Beetle. But when Frehley suddenly splits town, straight-laced Peter and his buddies are shocked to find themselves left with a massive hockey bag stuffed full of primo weed.

Cast

Production and release 
In a 2003 announcement with Playback, Jason Priestly, Bif Naked, Robb Wells, and John Paul Tremblay were originally slated to star in the film, which was also to have a budget of one million dollars and was to screen at the Atlantic Film Festival in 2003. Filming for A Bug and a Bag of Weed was postponed until May 24 - June 11, 2005, which took place in Halifax, Nova Scotia minus the aforementioned actors and on a budget of $500,000. The film screened at the 2006 Atlantic Film Festival on September 22.

Soundtrack
The Soundtrack features music from The Kings, Russell Webb, Bob Melanson, Shocore, Crush, By Divine Right, Amelia Curran, JANA JANA, Jagged, King Konqueror, Jonathan Andrews, Obscura, Dark Armpit, Spesh K, Paul MacCuish, Fresh Little Candies, Laura Kohoot, Gone Twenty-One, A/V, Motion Soundtrack, Tuuli and The Honey Brothers.

Reception 
In his book Shooting from the East: Filmmaking on the Canadian Atlantic, Darrell Varga criticized A Bug and a Bag of Weed and compared it negatively to the film Touch and Go, calling the plot "ridiculous" and "a faux-transgressive pot plot rolled in sit-com paper".

References

External links
 
 
 Telefilm Canada

2006 films
2006 comedy films
Canadian comedy films
Canadian films about cannabis
English-language Canadian films
2000s English-language films
2000s Canadian films